Naratheinga Uzana (also known as Naratheinkha Uzana; 1190s–1235) was the regent of Pagan from c. 1231 to 1235. He was crown prince prior to his regency. He is regarded by some historians G.H. Luce and Than Tun as king between 1231 and 1235 but others Htin Aung and Michael Aung-Thwin do not accept him as king.

One contemporary stone inscription identifies him as the crown prince, and another identifies him as the king. Neither inscription provides any regnal dates but they were conjecturally dated c. 1230 or c. 1231 by Luce. Luce and Than Tun accept that he was king. It is not universally accepted. Htin Aung does not accept Luce's proposed regnal dates; he argues that the fact that none of the chronicles identifies him as king shows that "his succession was disputed or officially unrecognized." According to Htin Aung, he may have been a pretender to the throne for a few months. Aung-Thwin does not identify Naratheinga as king either.

Notes

References

Bibliography
 
 
 
 

Burmese monarchs
Pagan dynasty
Heirs apparent who never acceded
13th-century Burmese people
12th-century Burmese people